Jennifer Clark-Rouire (born May 18, 1975 in Winnipeg, Manitoba) is a Canadian curler. She currently throws skip stones for her rink out of Winnipeg, Manitoba. She is best known however as being the perennial alternate for Jennifer Jones at various national and world championships.

Clark-Rouire won 2008 the World Women's Curling Championship with skip Jennifer Jones, beating China in the final.

Personal life
Clark-Rouire owns Storm Catering. She is married and has two children.

References

External links

1975 births
Living people
Canadian women curlers
Curlers from Winnipeg
World curling champions
Canadian women's curling champions